Aarón Herrera Cen (born 11 September 1990) is a Mexican professional boxer and is the current WBC Mundo Hispano Lightweight Champion.

Professional career
Herrera started boxing as an amateur in the city of Valladolid at the age of 12. His father first trained him before he decided to move to Mérida to train with Román Acosta. He began his professional career in 2006.

On March 23, 2011 Aarón knocked out Lizandro de Los Santos to win the WBC Mundo Hispano lightweight title.

Herrera stayed undefeated until 21 July 2012 when he lost for the first time by decision before Fernando García in Tijuana.

In 2013 Aaron "La Joya" Herrera began his international career fighting in Philippines against Jason Pagara and then in Germany against Turkish boxer Selcuk Aydin. He lost both fights, one by decision and the second one by KO.

After these defeats, Aaron Herrera's career changed radically when he decided to leave his trainer Roman Acosta for the Cuban Julio Tarrago. This change actually seemed to give him a second breath in boxing with a first victory by KO against Enrique "Huracan" Ramos in his native Valladolid in December 2013 and a second victory also by KO against the boxer Manuel Cubanito Mares, seen in the show Campeon Box Azteca.

Controversy arose in March 2015 when Herrera was awarded a TKO victory against Raul Hinojosa by referee David Silva just 1 minute and 39 seconds into the fight, even after seemingly failing to land any blows on his opponent.

Professional boxing record

References

External links

Boxers from Yucatán (state)
Light-welterweight boxers
1990 births
Living people
Mexican male boxers
People from Valladolid, Yucatán